Everyman Media Group plc (known as Everyman Cinemas) is a cinema company based in London, England. The company was founded in 2000, when entrepreneur Daniel Broch bought the original Everyman Cinema in Hampstead, London, which dated to 1933, which before then was a theatre. Broch led the growth of the company with the acquisition in 2008 of Screen Cinemas to add more locations. This coincided with Broch selling a majority stake in the enlarged company, though he remains a shareholder. Following the acquisition, the group has refurbished or plans to refurbish a number of cinemas. Those already refurbished include Walton, Belsize Park, Baker Street, and The Screen On The Green in Islington. Everyman's cinemas have one to five screens, a small number of which offer 3D.

Everyman Cinemas offer a programme of films and special events, including the Metropolitan Opera from New York and the National Theatre (in selected cinemas), live Q&As, film festivals and seasons. The venues each feature a licensed bar, food, digital projection and surround sound technology.

The group is extending its operating area and has opened cinemas in northern England. The first of these opened in Leeds in April 2013 as part of the Trinity Leeds development in the city centre and a second opened within The Mailbox in Birmingham on 27 February 2015. A further cinema opened in Harrogate in September 2016. In April 2015, the company reached an agreement to buy four cinemas from its larger rival Odeon for £7.1 million.

In August 2013, The Guardian reported that the entire non-management staff of about 100 is employed on zero-hour contracts, earning just above the minimum wage, and without any guaranteed set hours each week. An Everyman staff member told the newspaper: "Our zero-hour contracts and low wages mean that affording basic necessities is becoming impossible. We work almost full-time, yet have no security, sick pay or benefits. Our customers are paying more and more for cinema tickets, but the company does everything it can to keep the cost of their staff as low as possible. It's not interested in the hardship this causes."

The Everyman Media Group plc made its début on the Alternative Investment Market (AIM) on 7 November 2013.

Current locations

Future locations 
The company is currently expanding their list of venues.

Northallerton

Durham

Plymouth

Salisbury

Impact of the COVID-19 pandemic 

In March 2020, Everyman Cinemas and all other cinemas in the UK closed indefinitely due to a national lockdown in response to the ongoing COVID-19 pandemic. They started a phased reopening in July 2020.

References

Cinema chains in the United Kingdom
Cinemas in London
Companies listed on the Alternative Investment Market